The 2022 Coupe de France final was a football match between Nice and Nantes to decide the winner of the 2021–22 Coupe de France, the 105th season of the Coupe de France. Originally scheduled to take place on 8 May at the Stade de France in Saint-Denis, Paris, the final was moved to 7 May in consultation with competing clubs and the broadcasters.

Nantes won the match 1–0 for their fourth Coupe de France title.

Background
Nice reached the final this year for the fifth time in its history, and the first since 1997, a game they won over Guingamp after a penalty shoot-out following a 1–1 draw in extra time.

Nantes reached the final this year for the fourth time in its history, having lost at the round of 64 of last year's edition to Lens. This was the first time they reached the final since 2000, a game they won over Calais.

Route to the final

''Note: H = home fixture, A = away fixture

Match

Details

Notes

References

2022
Coupe De France Final 2022
Coupe De France Final 2022
Coupe De France Final
Coupe de France
Coupe De France Final
Coupe De France Final